Gareth John Roberts (born 15 January 1959, in Pont-Lliw) is a former international Wales rugby union player. He was in the Wales squad for the 1987 Rugby World Cup, scoring two tries.

References 

1959 births
Living people
Barbarian F.C. players
Cardiff RFC players
Llanelli RFC players
People educated at Gowerton Grammar School
Rugby union players from Swansea
Swansea RFC players
Wales international rugby union players
Welsh rugby union players
Rugby union number eights